The 2015–16 Biathlon World Cup – World Cup 3  was held in Pokljuka, Slovenia, from 17 December until 20 December 2015.

Schedule of events

Medal winners

Men

Women

References 

2015–16 Biathlon World Cup
Biathlon World Cup
Biathlon competitions in Slovenia
December 2015 sports events in Europe